Mads Lillelund Langer (née Langer Clausen; born 14 January 1984) is a Danish singer-songwriter, who became internationally known for his cover of "You're Not Alone" by the British band Olive. He is a multi platinum and multi award winning artist in his home country Denmark.

The follow-up to Reckless Twin was a 2016 album featuring his hit single “3AM” which he co-produced with Jamie Hartman. Langer’s forthcoming full-length reclaims a certain unfettered spirit from his first attempts at songwriting. “I feel like I can learn a lot from my earliest material, because it was so pure,” says Langer, who began playing piano at age 3 and writing songs at 8. “With the new album, I made a point of getting back to what I first loved about music: those moments where a song comes together and you don’t really know how it happened, and it just gives you the chills.”

Career 
Growing up in the countryside near the small town of Skive, Langer was born to schoolteachers who raised him on singer/songwriters like Neil Young, Rickie Lee Jones, Bob Dylan, and Carole King. From a young age he found his imagination sparked by his surroundings, an idyllic dreamland of forests and farmland and rivers. (“As a child I loved writing all these dark poems and horror stories about ghosts—I was always drawn to the supernatural,” he recalls.) Although he pursued training in jazz piano throughout his school years, Langer decided against attending The Royal Danish Academy of Music after high school, and instead moved to Copenhagen to make music on his own. “For a while I quit piano,” he notes. “I got a guitar and taught myself without theory, and it was so liberating to just play by ear and by my heart.”

Once in Copenhagen, Langer began recording demos in his apartment and later landed a deal with Copenhagen Records, who released his full-length debut Attention Please in 2006. When the album failed to take off, Langer bought an old car and drove all around Europe, stopping in various cities to busk in the streets. “That whole experience really helped me find my direction as an artist, because it was all about building that connection between the songs and the audience,” he says. “I’d be in Barcelona, just playing a song in the street, and all of a sudden there’d be a quite a big crowd—everything happening in this very organic way.”

After returning from his trip, Langer set to work on his self-titled sophomore effort. Arriving in 2009, Mads Langer features “Fact – Fiction”: a platinum single that wholly embodies his sensibilities in its quietly intense vocal delivery, mesmerizing melodies, and storytelling that captures the precise ache of loneliness. Following the breakout success of the album, Langer moved to London and inked a deal with Sony Music, soon setting off on a meteoric trajectory in his music career. Along with putting out three celebrated albums with Sony (including 2013’s double platinum-certified In These Waters), he took on a prolific touring schedule that at one point saw him playing 10 sold-out shows in a row at Vega in Copenhagen (one of Europe’s premier music venues).

For Langer, “Fact – Fiction” serves as an enduring touchstone for his songwriting. “I’ve always had this black hole in the middle of me, filled with a lot of big questions about the world we’re living in, and that’s where I write from,” he says. “Even though I’m where I want to be in life now, my main source of inspiration is all the painful things we go through that are hard to talk about. I think it’ll always be that way, and I really don’t mind—I like going into that dark space, because now it feels safe to me, like home.”

In creating his upcoming album, Langer has traveled to far-flung cities like L.A. and London and Berlin, collaborating with some of the most in-demand producers and songwriters in music today and purposely imbuing that raw-nerve honesty into his songs. In that process, Langer aims to strike a delicate balance between contrasting emotions, possibly giving way to an unexpected harmony. “To me music has the strongest impact when it’s got a melancholic feeling but also gives me hope, and that’s the sweet spot I’m always trying to find,” says Langer. “I’m a hyper-sensitive person and music has always helped me deal with that,” he adds, “so at the same time I want to get through to all the other extra-sensitive people out there. I’d love for them to feel some kind of recognition in my music, and maybe get a little peace of mind.”

Discography

Studio albums

Live albums and EPs 
 Fact-Fiction. Pop – or ??? (EP, 2008), Copenhagen Records
 Amstrdm EP (EP, 2011), Sony Music
 Side Effects (EP, 2014), Sony Music
 All the Time, Sometimes (EP, 2017)

Singles 

Other singles (charting)

Other singles (non-charting)
2005: "Breaking News"
2006: "Poem with No Rhyme"
2009: "Wake Me Up in Time"
2009: "Too Close" (with Mike Sheridan)
2009: "Last Flower"
2011: "Riding Elevators"
2012: "Something New"

Notes and references

External links 
 Official site
Lyrics – Mads Langer – Elephant

1984 births
Danish pop musicians
Living people
People from Skive Municipality